Bade Airport is an airport in South Papua, Indonesia.

References

Airports in South Papua